Soul Music is a fantasy novel by British writer Terry Pratchett, the sixteenth book in the Discworld series, first published in 1994. Like many of Pratchett's novels it introduces an element of modern society into the magical and vaguely late medieval, early modern world of the Discworld, in this case Rock and Roll music and stardom, with near disastrous consequences. It also introduces Susan Sto Helit, daughter of Mort and Ysabell and granddaughter of Death.

Plot summary
A young harpist, Imp Y Celyn from Llamedos (spelled backwards, "sod 'em all", a tribute to Llareggub in Welsh poet Dylan Thomas' Under Milk Wood), comes to Ankh-Morpork in hopes of becoming famous.  Unable to afford the Musicians Guild fees, he and fellow unlicensed musicians Lias Bluestone (a troll percussionist) and Glod Glodsson (a dwarf hornblower) form "The Band with Rocks In", named after Lias' tuned rocks.  When Imp's harp is destroyed, he acquires a guitar from a mysterious shop, unaware that it contains the awareness of a primordial music that was responsible for bringing the universe into existence.  Imp takes the new name "Buddy", as "Imp Y Celyn" literally means "bud of holly", and Lias starts calling himself "Cliff".

Meanwhile, Death is upset over the deaths of his adopted daughter Ysabell and her husband, his former apprentice Mort.  Their daughter, Susan Sto Helit, was initially raised with an awareness of Death as her grandfather, but they later withheld the truth from her and she forgot about it.  She attends boarding school in Quirm, and is content to avoid unpleasant conversations by using her unexplained ability to fade from others' awareness.  When Death abandons his post, going on an impromptu sabbatical in an effort to forget the painful memories, the fabric of reality forces Susan to take on his duties and she begins to remember her past.  She becomes aware of Buddy when he is scheduled to die in a riot while performing at the Mended Drum, but instead the crowd is overcome by the spirit of "Music with Rocks In", which apparently has no musical merit for objective listeners not themselves possessed by it.  After this, Buddy's life is powered by the music instead of by his natural life force.

Cut-Me-Own-Throat Dibbler becomes the Band's manager.  He hires the troll Asphalt as a roadie to accompany the band on its tour as he books them to play to increasingly large crowds throughout the city and the region, all the while keeping them unaware of the large profits he is earning.  Buddy is becoming less and less like himself, and barely seems aware of his surroundings when he is not playing the guitar.  Susan tries to protect him from the influence of the music; though she does not acknowledge it, she has developed feelings for him.  Meanwhile, the music is affecting many of the people who have heard it, causing them to form their own bands and adopt behaviours associated with the fans of various musical movements on 20th Century Earth.  The wizards of Unseen University are particularly affected by this phenomenon, though not Archchancellor Ridcully, who uses the newly invented device Hex and works with Susan in an effort to understand these events. And Mr Clete, the murderous secretary of the Musicians Guild, becomes increasingly unhinged by his inability to stop the Band's unauthorized activities (as they are protected by the music).

Buddy wants to perform a free concert at the music's behest, and Dibbler agrees after realizing how much of a profit he can earn through merchandising and concessions. A large number of the copycat bands participate in the largest concert of all time, culminating in the Band with Rocks In's performance.  Buddy also performs his own folk song on his harp, which Glod has had repaired, which briefly restores Imp's natural personality and grants him a moment of peace.  Afterwards, the band flees from their crazed fans, pursued by the Musicians Guild, Dibbler, Susan, and Death (who has been brought back to his senses by his servant Albert).  The music intends to create an immortal legend by crashing the band's coach into a gorge, with no survivors.  Susan rescues them, but the music begins to alter the timeline so the band will have died.  Death arrives and plays an "empty chord" on the guitar to stop the music, explaining that while he can stop it, only a musician like Buddy can restart it.  The music agrees to allow Buddy to live in return for his playing a chord to restart it.  Death then destroys the guitar.

A new timeline is created in which Clete was the only fatality, although Susan remains aware of the original course of events.  She is returned to school (and also has been there all along) with a new self-assurance.  The next day, she runs to reunite with Imp upon realizing that, in the new version of events, he came to Quirm instead of Ankh-Morpork and is working nearby.

Characters

The Band With Rocks In:

Imp y Celyn: Member (lead vocals & eclectric whatzit)
Glod Glodsson: Member (Horn)
Lias Bluestone: Member (Percussion)
The Librarian: Short-term member (Organ)
Asphalt: Roadie
CMOT Dibbler: Manager

The Death family and associates:
Death
Susan Sto-Helit
Mort
Ysabell
Binky
Death of Rats
Albert
Quoth

Ankh-Morpork Musicians Guild:
Mr. Clete
Mr. Satchelmouth Lemon
Herbert Shuffle
Grisham Frord Close Harmony Singers

The Wizards:
Mustrum Ridcully
The Dean
The Bursar
Lecturer in Recent Runes
Senior Wrangler
Chair of Indefinite Studies
Ponder Stibbons
Adrian Turnipseed

Appearance in other media

An animated adaptation was produced by Cosgrove Hall Films for Channel 4 in 1996. It takes the association of the "Band with Rocks In" with the Beatles even further than the book does, evolving their style from 1950s rock and early 1960s beat music (and mixing-bowl haircuts) in Ankh-Morpork, to acid rock in Scrote, to spiritual hippie rock in Quirm. In Sto Lat, they sound like the Jimi Hendrix Experience or Bad Company, but are dressed in clothes similar to the Beatles on the cover of the Sgt. Pepper's Lonely Hearts Club Band album. Also in Quirm, Buddy says that the band is 'more popular than cheeses', referring to John Lennon's famous quote proclaiming the Beatles to be more popular than Jesus. In Pseudopolis, their outfits and style resemble the Blues Brothers. Crash's band is also given the name "Socks Pastels".

The soundtrack was released on CD; and is available from plutomusic.com, Amazon MP3, iTunes Store and Spotify

In August 2014, an adaptation was performed at the Rose Theatre, Kingston by Youth Music Theatre UK. The musical has been adapted by stand-up comedian Andrew Doyle with original music by Craig Adams. Soul Music will be directed by Luke Sheppard (associate director of Matilda the Musical and director of In the Heights) at the Southwark Playhouse and choreographed by Cressida Carré.

In February 2016, a stage adaption was performed at the Durham Student Theatre by Ooook! Productions. The production was adapted by Imogen Eddleston and directed by Mikey Bicarregui and Hamish Inglis.

References

Sources
  Hardcover: 

  Hardcover: 

  Paperback: 

  Paperback: 

  Largeprint: 

  Paperback:

External links

 
 Annotations for Soul Music on L-Space
 Quotes from Soul Music on L-Space

1994 British novels
Discworld books
1994 fantasy novels
Novels about music
British novels adapted into television shows
Victor Gollancz Ltd books
Works about the music industry
British comedy novels